The Great War is the ninth studio album by Swedish heavy metal band Sabaton. It was released on 19 July 2019. It is the first studio album to feature guitarist Tommy Johansson. Like many of Sabaton's albums, it is a concept album, this time about World War I, often known as the Great War. The songs cover multiple stories from the war, including those of Manfred von Richthofen, T.E. Lawrence, Alvin York, the Attack of the Dead Men, the Battle of Verdun, and others.

The album's first single, "Fields of Verdun", was released on 3 May 2019. The album's next single, "The Red Baron" was released on 13 June. The title song, "Great War", was released as a single on 27 June. A music video for the track "82nd All the Way" was released on 20 July. A music video for "Seven Pillars of Wisdom", in which Indy Neidell plays the role of T. E. Lawrence, was filmed in the Tunisian desert in early September, and was released on 21 December. A live video and single for "The Attack of the Dead Men", recorded during a 13 March 2020 performance in Moscow that included Russian-language metal cover artist Radio Tapok singing the verses, were announced 8 May 2020 for a 10 July release.

The album was released in four separate editions: the standard release, a history edition with contextual narration preceding each track, a soundtrack edition featuring instrumental orchestral versions of the songs, and a Sabaton History Patreon exclusive release containing narration by Indy Neidell.

The recorded lyrics for "82nd All the Way" mistakenly attribute Sergeant Alvin York to the 338th Regiment rather than his actual assignment to the 328th Infantry Regiment. The band corrects the mistake during live performances of the song.

Reception
The Great War garnered mostly positive reviews. Metal Hammers Holly Wright gave it 4/5 stars, praising it as "a rip-roaring, riff-addled march towards victory, coaxing influences from folk and power metal that sounds remarkably upbeat for an account of bloodthirsty mass destruction." The Guardians Dave Simpson rated the album 3/5 stars and said he preferred the History version, which precedes the songs with voiceovers describing the events the songs are about. Loudwire named it one of the 50 best metal albums of 2019.

Cover versions
On 1 May 2019, Apocalyptica released their rendition of "Fields of Verdun".

On 18 July 2019, YouTube-based cover artist Radio Tapok released a Russian-language cover of "The Attack of the Dead Men" with Sabaton's assistance. Radio Tapok joined Sabaton on stage in Moscow the following spring during their Russian tour (cut short due to the COVID-19 pandemic shortly after). The performance was recorded and produced as a single for a 10 July 2020 release.

On 3 January 2020, Amaranthe released their rendition of "82nd All the Way".

Track listing

Personnel 
Band members
 Joakim Brodén – lead vocals, keyboards
 Pär Sundström – bass, backing vocals
 Chris Rörland – guitars, backing vocals
 Tommy Johannson – guitars, backing vocals
 Hannes Van Dahl – drums, backing vocals

Guest musicians
 Thobbe Englund – guitar solo on "Fields of Verdun"
 Antti Martikainen – orchestral arrangements on "Fields of Verdun", orchestral arrangements for the Soundtrack Edition
 Floor Jansen – additional vocals, vocals on Soundtrack Edition
 Bethan Dixon Bate – narration on History Edition
 Indy Neidell – narration on History Channel Edition

Production
 Jonas Kjellgren – production, engineering, mixing
 Maor Appelbaum – mastering engineer

Charts

Weekly charts

Year-end charts

Certifications

References

2019 albums
Concept albums
Sabaton (band) albums
Nuclear Blast albums